Barakaldo is a municipality located in the Biscay province in the Basque Country. Located on the Left Bank of the Estuary of Bilbao, the city is part of Greater Bilbao, has a population  at 100,881. Barakaldo has an industrial river-port heritage and has undergone significant redevelopment with new commercial and residential areas replacing the once active industrial zones.

History 

The 1911 Encyclopædia Britannica original entry on the town stated:

Iron mining formed a large part of Barakaldo's industry, making it the endpoint of a mining railway. The steel industry, led by Altos Hornos de Vizcaya, had an important presence during the 20th century, until the industrial recession hit the region's economy in the 1980s.

In recent decades, the industrial zones surrounding Barakaldo have become less prominent, which can be owed to the shuttering of large companies such as Babcock & Wilcox. Although several factories remain, areas that were once industrial have been redeveloped into residential properties such as malls and parks. A large exhibition centre. the Bilbao Exhibition Centre has recently been built on the outskirts of the town.

Transport

Barakaldo is connected to the rest of the Greater Bilbao metropolitan area by Line 2 of the Metro Bilbao. Four stations are in the city: Gurutzeta/Cruces, Ansio, Barakaldo and Bagatza). The Cercanías Bilbao train line has two stations in Barakaldo (Lutxana and Desertu-Barakaldo). BizkaiBus company provides a bus service, with connections to the rest of Biscay.

Locally, an urban bus system named Kbus operates with two lines. A tram line has been proposed to connect local districts.

The main motorway is the A-8 motorway, which also goes between Bilbao. It serves as the main road link between Greater Bilbao and the rest of Spain.

A boat ferry service connects Barakaldo to the other side of the Estuary of Bilbao in Erandio.

Demographics 
Population peaked in the 1990s to over 100,300. The decline of local industry decreased the population, though, and in 2002, 95,000 people lived in Barakaldo. However, a recent increase has sent the population to 100,502 residents.

Tourism 

Tourists visit sites in Barakaldo such as the Botanic Garden, the Bilbao Exhibition Centre, the medieval Bridge of Castrexana, and some of the city's street sculptures. In July, the town celebrates "Las Fiestas del Carmen," which includes open-air concerts and large fairs.

Sports 

Barakaldo is represented by the Barakaldo Club de Fútbol in Spain's Segunda División B. They play home games at the Estadio Nuevo Lasesarre. A second team, SD Retuerto Sport, plays in Tercera División. Local league teams include Gurutzeta KFT, UD Burtzeña, Pauldarrak FKT, Zuazo C.F. and S.C.D. Dosa-Salesianos.

Handball has played a part in Barakaldo's tradition. Now, two teams are present in competitions: Club Balonmano Zuazo Femenino, playing in División de Honor Femenina de Balonmano, and Club Balonmano Barakaldo who plays in the Liga ASOBAL.

Bizkaia Arena is an indoor arena with a capacity of 18,640. It hosted some games of the 2014 FIBA Basketball World Cup.

Notable natives 
 Asier del Horno, footballer
 Carlos Sobera, actor
 David López, cyclist
 Iñaki Lafuente, footballer
 Javier Clemente, football manager
 Javier González Gómez, footballer
 Javier Otxoa, cyclist
 Josep Lluís Núñez, president of FC Barcelona between 1978 and 2000
 Unai Expósito, footballer
 Antonio Iturmendi Bañales, politician
 Maisha MC, musician

See also
Barakaldo D.F., a Mägo de Oz concert DVD filmed in Barakaldo

References

External links

 www.i-barakaldo.com La comunidad virtual de Barakaldo
 Official website (in Basque / Spanish)
 BARAKALDO in the Bernardo Estornés Lasa - Auñamendi Encyclopedia (Euskomedia Fundazioa) 

 
Estuary of Bilbao
Municipalities in Biscay